The 2008 NCAA Women's Gymnastics championship involved 12 schools competing for the national championship of women's NCAA Division I gymnastics.  It was the twenty seventh NCAA gymnastics national championship and the defending NCAA Team Champion for 2007 was Georgia.  The Competition took place in Athens, Georgia hosted by the University of Georgia in Stegeman Coliseum. The 2008 Championship was won by Georgia, their fourth in a row.

Champions

References

External links
 NCAA Gymnastics Championship Official site

NCAA Women's Gymnastics championship
2008 in women's gymnastics